R. Bruce Elder, FRSC born , is a Canadian filmmaker and critic.

Described by New York filmmaker and critic Jonas Mekas as “the most important North American avant-garde filmmaker to emerge during the 1980′s,” Elder combines images, music and text to create works that reflect his interest in philosophy, technology, science, spirituality and the human body.

His first major film cycle, The Book of All the Dead, inspired by Dante Alighieri’s Commedia and Ezra Pound’s Cantos, grew out of his preoccupation with the horrors of modernity, its faith in progress and the loss of a sense of what is good and evil. His current film cycle, The Book of Praise, makes extensive use of computer-image generation, highlighting his fascination with mathematics and digital technology.

Elder received the 2007 Governor General's Award in Visual and Media Arts.  The jury described him as “highly innovative”, “influential” and “acutely intelligent” noting the enormous span of his practice and the demanding nature of his films.

Filmography

The Book of All the Dead (1975–1994)
(Listed in order of appearance in the Cycle rather than by production date)
REGION ONE: THE SYSTEM OF DANTE'S HELL
Breath/Light/Birth (1975)
The Art of Worldly Wisdom (1979)
1857 (Fool's Gold) (1981)
Illuminated Texts (1982)
Lamentations: A Monument to the Dead World, Part 1: The Dream of the Last Historian (1985)
Sweet Love Remembered (1980)
Lamentations: A Monument to the Dead World, Part 2: The Sublime Calculation (1985)
Permutations and Combinations (1976)
REGION TWO: CONSOLATIONS (LOVE IS AN ART OF TIME)
Consolations (Love Is an Art of Time) Part 1: The Fugitive Gods (1988)
Consolations (Love Is an Art of Time) Part 2: The Lighted Clearing (1988)
Consolations (Love Is an Art of Time) Part 3: The Body and the World (1988)
REGION THREE: EXULTATIONS (IN LIGHT OF THE GREAT GIVING)
Flesh Angels (1990)
Look! We Have Come Through! (1978)
Newton and Me (1990)
Barbara Is a Vision of Loveliness (1976)
Azure Serene (1992)
She Is Away (1976)
Exultations: In Light of the Great Giving (1993)
Burying the Dead: Into the Light (1993)
Trace (1980)
Et Resurrectus Est (1994)

The Book Of Praise (1997 – )
A Man Whose Life Was Full Of Woe Has Been Surprised By Joy (1997)
Crack, Brutal Grief (2000)
Eros and Wonder (2003)
Infunde Lumen Cordibus (2004)
The Young Prince (2007)
What Troubles The Peace At Brandenberg? (2011)
A Gathering Of Crystals (2015)

Bibliography
Image and Identity: Reflections on Canadian Film and Culture (Toronto and Waterloo: The Academy of Canadian Cinema and Wilfrid Laurier University Press, 1988)
The Body in Film (Toronto: Art Gallery of Ontario, 1989)
A Body of Vision: Representations of the Body in Recent Film and Poetry (Waterloo: Wilfrid Laurier University Press, 1997)
The Films of Stan Brakhage in the American Tradition of Ezra Pound, Gertrude Stein and Charles Olson (Waterloo : Wilfrid Laurier University Press, 1998)
Harmony and Dissent: Film and Avant-garde Art Movements in the Early Twentieth Century (Waterloo: Wilfrid Laurier University Press, 2009)
Dada, Surrealism, and the Cinematic Effect (Waterloo: Wilfrid Laurier University Press, 2013)
Cubism and Futurism: Spiritual Machines and the Cinematic Effect (Waterloo: Wilfrid Laurier University Press, 2018)

References

External links
 R. Bruce Elder—Official Site

Living people
1947 births
Governor General's Award in Visual and Media Arts winners
Canadian experimental filmmakers
Canadian film historians